
This is a list of aircraft in numerical order of manufacturer followed by alphabetical order beginning with 'M'.

Ma

Mabley
(J.Mabley, Rexdale, Ontario)
 Mabley White Monoplane

MAC 
(Melbourne Aircraft Corporation)
 MAC Mamba

Mac Para Technology
(Rožnov pod Radhoštěm, Czech Republic)
Mac Bitch
Mac Blaze
Mac Charger
Mac Eden
Mac Elan
Mac Icon
Mac Intox
Mac Magus
Mac Muse
Mac Paradox
Mac Pasha
Mac Progress
Mac T-Ride
Mac Whistler
Mac Yukon

Macair 
(Macair Industries)
 Macair Merlin

Macchi 
(Giulio Macchi / Nieuport-Macchi / Aeronautica Macchi S.p.A.)

 Nieuport-Macchi N.VI
 Nieuport-Macchi Parasol
 Nieuport-Macchi N.10
 Nieuport-Macchi N.11
 Nieuport-Macchi N.17
 Macchi C.3
 Macchi L.1
 Macchi L.2
 Macchi L.3
 Macchi M.3
 Macchi M.4
 Macchi M.5
 Macchi M.6
 Macchi M.7
 Macchi M.8
 Macchi M.9
 Macchi M.9bis
 Macchi M.12
 Macchi M.12bis
 Macchi M.14
 Macchi M.15
 Macchi M.15bis
 Macchi M.16
 Macchi M.17
 Macchi M.18
 Macchi M.19
 Macchi M.20
 Macchi M.24
 Macchi M.26
 Macchi M.29
 Macchi M.33
 Macchi M.39
 Macchi M.40
 Macchi M.41
 Macchi M.52
 Macchi M.53
 Macchi M.67
 Macchi M.70
 Macchi M.71
 Macchi MC.72
 Macchi MC.73
 Macchi MC.73 Idro
 Macchi MC.77
 Macchi MC.94
 Macchi MC.99
 Macchi MC.100
 Macchi MC.200
 Macchi MC.201
 Macchi MC.202
 Macchi MC.205
 Macchi MC.206
 Macchi MC.207
 Macchi MB.307
 Macchi MB.308
 Macchi MB.320
 Macchi MB.323
 Macchi MB.326
 Macchi M.416
 Macchi-Lockheed AL.60

MacCready 
 Gossamer Condor
 Gossamer Albatross
 Gossamer Owl
 Gossamer Penguin
 MacCready Bionic Bat

MacDonald 

 MacDonald Sportflight A

MacDonald 
((Robert A) MacDonald Aircraft Co, Sonoma, CA)
 MacDonald S-20
 MacDonald S-21

Mace-Trefethen 
(Harvey Mace & Alfred Trefethen, Sacramento, CA)
 Mace-Trefethen M-101 Macerschmitt
 Mace-Trefethen M-102 Scorchy
 Mace-Trefethen R-1 Mr B
 Mace-Trefethen R-2 Shark
 Mace-Trefethen Seamaster

Macera 
(Silvano Macera)
 Macera Sparviero

Macfam 
(Macfam World Traders)
 Macfam SA 102.5 Cavalier
 Macfam SA 103 Cavalier
 Macfam SA 104 Cavalier
 Macfam SA 105 Super Cavalier

Mack 
(Mack-Craft Amphibian Corp Inc (Fdr: R U McIntosh), Plymouth, MI)
 Mack Dolphin

MacManaman 
(James E MacManaman, Springfield, OR)
 MacManaman 1930 Monoplane
 MacManaman Baby Fleet

Madison 
(Madison Airport Company Inc, Madison, WI)
 Madison Super Ace

Maeda 
 Maeda Ku-1
 Maeda Ku-6

Maestranza Central de Aviación 
 Maestranza Central de Aviación Triciclo-Experimental
 Maestranza Central de Aviación XX-01
 Maestranza Central de Aviación HF XX-02

MAG
(Magyar Altalános Gepgyár RT – MAG – {Ungarische Allgemaine Mascinenfabrik AG})
 MAG-Fokker Triplane 90.01 (Fokker V 6?)
 MAG-Fokker Triplane 90.02 (Fokker V 4)
 MAG-Fokker 90.03 (Fokker V 7)
 MAG-Fokker 90.04 (Fokker V 12)
 MAG-Fokker 90.05 (Fokker V 22)

Magal
(Magal Holdings Ltd.)
 Magal Cuby I
 Magal Cuby II
 Magal Copy Cub

Magni 
(Laboratorio Costruzioni Aeronautiche Piero Magni / Piero Magni Aviazione S.A.I.)
 Magni Vale
 Magni Supervale
 Magni PM.1 Vittoria
 Magni PM.2
 Magni PM.3

Magni 
(Magni Gyro s.r.l.)
 Magni-Tervamäki MT-5
 Magni-Tervamäki MT-7
 Magni M-14 Scout
 Magni M-16 Tandem Trainer
 Magni M-18 Spartan
 Magni M-22 Voyager
 Magni XM-23 Orion
 Magni M-24 Orion
 Magni M-26
 Magni VPM S-2

Magnum
(Terrence O'Neill, President OAC, Magnum)
 Magnum Pickup

Mahoney 
(Lee Mahoney)
 Mahoney Sorceress

Mahoney-Ryan 
( B F Mahoney-Ryan Aircraft Co, San Diego, CA)
 Mahoney-Ryan X-1 Special a.k.a. Sportster
 Mahoney-Ryan B-1
 Mahoney-Ryan B-2
 Mahoney-Ryan B-3 Brougham

MAI 
(Moscow Aviation Institute)
 MAI E-2
 MAI E-3
 MAI Boldrev
 MAI Elf
 MAI EMAI
 MAI Foton
 MAI Kvant (Quantum)
 MAI Semburg
 MAI-SKB-3PM
 MAI Junior
 MAI-62
 MAI-89
 OSKBES MAI-208
 Oskbes Aviatika Mai 920 – Oskbes MAI Moskau Aviation Institut
 MAI-223 Kityonok
 MAI-890
 MAI-890U
 Aviatika-MAI-890SKh Farmer
 Aviatika-MAI-890USKh
 Aviatika-MAI-890S
 MAI-900 Acrobat
 OSKBES MAI-920
 MAI-980U
 MAI-980CSH
 MAI Marathon
 MAI-03
 MAI-53
 MAI-56
 MAI-60 Snezhinka
 MAI-63
 MAI-68
 MAI-890
 MAI-920

Maillet Nennig 
 Maillet Nennig MN-A

Mainair Sports 
Mainair Blade
Mainair Blade 582
Mainair Blade 912
Mainair Rapier

Mair 
(E Mair, 3106 W Fullerton Ave, Chicago, IL)
 Mair 1910 Biplane

Makelan 
(Makelan Corporation, New Braunfels, TX)
Hatz Bantam
Hatz CB-1
Hatz Classic

Makhonine 
(Ivan Makhonine)
 Makhonine Mak-10
 Makhonine Mak-101
 Makhonine Mak-123

Makino
(T. Makino with Mr Hirano and Mr Oki)
 Makino MHO.235

Malcolm 
(Malcolm Aircraft)
 Malcolm Merlin

Malev 
 Malev ILL-62M

Malinowski
(Stefan Malinowski)
 Stemal III
 Malinowski Dziaba

Man Planes 
(Man Planes Inc, Manitowoc, WI)
 Man Planes MP-1

Manfred Weiss 
Data from:
 Manfred Weiss Hungária
 Manfred Weiss WM-9 Budapest Foker C.V-E
 Manfred Weiss EM-10 Siemens Sh.12 engine
 Manfred Weiss WM-10 Ölyv (Buzzard/Hawk)
 Manfred Weiss WM-11 Budapest FokKer C.V
 Manfred Weiss WM-13 (WM-10a re-engined with a 130hp Sport III)
 Manfred Weiss WM-14 Budapest Fokker C.V-D
 Manfred Weiss WM-16 Budapest
 WM-16A with  Gnome-Rhône 9K Mistral, 9 built
 WM-16B with  Gnome-Rhône 14K Mistral Major, 9 built
 Manfred Weiss WM-17 – [Project] single-seat fighter aircraft
 Manfred Weiss WM-18 – [Project] single-seat fighter aircraft
 Manfred Weiss WM-20 Heinkel HD.22 deriv.
 Manfred Weiss WM-21 Sólyom development of WM-16
 Manfred Weiss WM-23 Ezüst Nyíl – prototype, 1 built, crashed on 21 April 1942 during a test flight after losing an aileron
 WM-23B – [Project], 2-seater reconnaissance*** WM-23 with rear defence.
 WM-23G – [Project], Gyakorlo (Advanced Trainer) based on WM-23 fighter
 Manfred Weiss WM-24 – [Project] possible desig. for Daimler- Benz DB603-powered WM-23/WM-123 fighter
 Manfred Weiss WM-123 Ezüst Nyíl II – [Project] alt desig for DB603-powered WM-23 fighter

Mangin 
(Guy Mangin)
 Mangin MRC.1

Manhattan 
(Manhattan Aeroplane Co, consortium of former Brooklyn Aero Club members, New Nork, NY)
 Manhattan 1913 Biplane

Manko / Man-pi 
(Manshu Koku KK / Manshu Hikoki Seizo KK – Manchurian Airways Co. Ltd / Manchurian Aeroplane Manufacturing Co. Ltd.)
 Manko MT-1 Hayabusa Passenger Transport
 Manko MT-2 Light Passenger Transport

Manley-Stewart 
(B B Stewart & F E Manley, Salem, OR)
 Manley-Stewart H-200

Mann Egerton 
 Mann Egerton Type B
 Mann Egerton Type H

Mann & Grimmer 
 Mann & Grimmer M.1

Manorplane 
(Florian F Manor, Fon du Lac, WI)
 Manorplane T-1

Mannesmann 
"Poll" Triplane

Mansyū 
 Mansyū Ki-79
 Mansyū Army Type 2 Advanced Trainer
 Mansyū Ki-98

Manta 
(Manta Aircraft Corp (John P & David R Davis), 540 N LaBrea Ave, Los Angeles, CA)
 Manta 1940 Monoplane
 Manta long-range fighter

Manta 
(Manta Products Inc)
Manta Foxbat

Mantelli 

 Mantelli AM-6
 Mantelli AM-8
 Mantelli AM-9
 Mantelli AM-10 Triete
 Mantelli AM-11 Albatros
 Mantelli AM-12

Mantz 
(United Air Services (Paul Mantz), Burbank, CA)
 Mantz 1938 Pusher
 Mantz 1950 Pusher

Manzolini 
(Conte Ettore Manzolini di Campoleone)
Manzolini Libellula

Marais
(Charles Marais)
 Marais Avionette

Maranda 
(Maranda Aircraft Company)
 Maranda BM1 Loisir
 Maranda BM1-A Super Loisir
 Maranda BM3
 Maranda BM4 Hawk
 Maranda BM5

Marawing 
(Kolin, Czech Republic)
Marawing 1-L Malamut

Marbella Parapente
(Málaga, Spain)
Marbella Parapente Paramotor PAP

Marchaudon
 Marchaudon Scarabee 01

Marchetti 
(Ing. Alessandro Marchetti)
 Marchetti La Chimera sport biplane of 1910

Marchetti-Vickers-Terni 
 M.V.T. Scout (SIAI S.50)

Marchetti 
((Paul) Marchetti Motor Patents Inc, Mills Field, San Bruno, CA)
 Marchetti M-1
 Marchetti M-2 Arrow

Marchetti 
(Emerino Marchetti, Tuckahoe NY )
 Marchetti Sport

Marchetti 
(Frank Marchetti, Chicago)
 Marchetti Avenger

Marcotte 
(Kenneth Marcotte, Bedford Park, IL)
 Marcotte Rich Mixture II

Marcoux-Bromberg 
(Hal W Marcoux-Jack Bromberg, Venice, CA.)
 Marcoux-Bromberg 1938 Monoplane a.k.a. Elmendorf Special
 Marcoux-Bromberg Special

Marenco Swiss helicopter 
 Marenco SwissHelicopter SKYe SH09

Marendez 
(Marendaz Aircraft Ltd /  D. M. K. Marendaz)
 Wickner-Marendaz Mk I
 Marendaz Mk III
 Marendaz Mk IV
 Marendaz Trainer

Margański
(Edward Margański)
 Margański EM-5A Dudus Kudlacz

Margański & Mysłowski 
(Margański & Mysłowski Zakłady Lotnicze – Margański & Mysłowski Aviation Works)
 EM-10 Bielik
 EM-11 Orka
 MDM MDM-1 Fox
 Swift S-1

Marie 
(Jean-Pierre Marie)
 Marie JPM.01 Médoc

Marinac 
(J G Marinac)
 Marinac Flying Mercury

Marinavia 
( Marinavia Farina SRL)
 Marinavia QR-2
 Marinavia QR-2bis
 Marinavia QR-14 Levriero
 Marinavia QR-22

Marine 
(Marine Aircraft Co, Sausalito, CA)
 Marine Water Sprite

Marine Corps Warfighting Laboratory 
 Dragon Eye

Marinens Flyvebaatfabrikk 
 Marinens Flyvebaatfabrikk M.F.1
 Marinens Flyvebaatfabrikk M.F.2
 Marinens Flyvebaatfabrikk M.F.3
 Marinens Flyvebaatfabrikk M.F.4
 Marinens Flyvebaatfabrikk M.F.5
 Marinens Flyvebaatfabrikk M.F.6
 Marinens Flyvebaatfabrikk M.F.7
 Marinens Flyvebaatfabrikk M.F.8
 Marinens Flyvebaatfabrikk M.F.9
 Marinens Flyvebaatfabrikk M.F.10
 Marinens Flyvebaatfabrikk M.F.11
 Marinens Flyvebaatfabrikk M.F.12
 Marinens Flyvebaatfabrikk W.33

Mariner Aircraft 
Mariner Aircraft Mariner

Marinosyan
(Alexander Marinosyan)
 Marinosyan M-235

Marion 
(George Whysall & Assoc aka Marion Aircraft Co, 280 N Main, Marion, OH)
 Marion 1929 Monoplane
 Marion Whysall

Mark 
(Mark Flugzeugbau)
Mark Shark

Märkische 
(Märkische Flugzeug-Werke)
 Märkische D.I

Markwalder 
( Ing. A. Markwalder of Räterschen, Switzerland)
 Markwalder Marabu

Marlman 
(William Marland, CO)
 Marlman Flying Box

Marquardt 
(Marquardt Aircraft Co, Venice and Van Nuys, CA)
 Marquardt M-14 a.k.a. Whirlajet

Marquart 
(Edward Marquart, Riverside, CA)
 Marquart MA-3 Maverick
 Marquart MA-4 Lancer
 Marquart MA-5 Charger

Marquian 
(Roger Marquian)
 Marquian RM.01

Marrone 
(Vincent Marrone, Roosevelt, NY)
 Marrone VM-1

Mars 
(James C "Bud" Mars)
 Mars Skylark

Mars 
(Mars Mfg Co, LeMars, IA)
 Mars M-1-80 Skycoupe

Marsh 
(Marsh Aviation Co, Mesa, AZ)
 Marsh G-164 C-T Turbo Cat
 Marsh S2R-T Turbo Thrush
 Marsh TS-2E Turbo-Tracker
 Marsh Turbo Mentor

Marsh 
(Marsh Aircraft Co, Oak Park, IL)
 Marsh 1930 Monoplane

Marshall 
(Marshall Aircraft Co )
 Marshall E-1

Marshall 
(Marshall Aircraft Laboratories (Nicholas-Beazley employees' group), Marshall, MO)
 Marshall Phantom

Marshalls 
(Marshall Aerospace / Marshalls of Cambridge)
 Marshalls MA.4

Marston & Ordway 
(C J Marston & P W Ordway, Concord, NH)
 Marston & Ordway 1930 Biplane

Martens
(Arthur Martens)
 Martens Windhund

Martin 
 Martin A-15
 Martin A-22 Maryland
 Martin A-23 Baltimore
 Martin A-30 Baltimore
 Martin A-45
 Martin AT-23
 Martin B-10
 Martin B-12
 Martin B-13
 Martin B-14
 Martin B-16
 Martin B-26 Marauder
 Martin B-27
 Martin B-33 Super Marauder
 Martin B-48
 Martin B-51
 Martin B-57 Canberra
 Martin B-68
 Martin XB-907
 Martin C-3
 Martin XLB-4
 Martin XO-4
 Martin X-23 PRIME
 Martin P-5 Marlin
 Martin AM Mauler
 Martin BM
 Martin BTM
 Martin T-1
 Martin JM
 Martin JRM Mars
 Martin MO
 Martin M2O
 Martin MS
 Martin NBS-1
 Martin N2M
 Martin PM
 Martin P2M
 Martin P3M
 Martin P4M Mercator
 Martin P5M Marlin
 Martin P6M SeaMaster
 Martin P7M SubMaster
 Martin PBM Mariner
 Martin PB2M Mars
 Martin RM
 Martin SC
 Martin T2M
 Martin T3M
 Martin T4M
 Martin T5M
 Martin No.1 1909 Biplane
 Martin 1909-1910 Monoplane
 Martin 1911 Biplane
 Martin 1912 Landplane
 Martin 1912 Tractor1
 Martin 1913 Hydroaeroplane
 Martin 1913 Pusher
 Martin 1913 Special
 Martin-Willard 1914 Biplane
 Martin 66 Night Mail Plane
 Martin 67
 Martin 70 Commercial
 Martin 123
 Martin M-130 Clipper
 Martin 139
 Martin 145
 Martin 146
 Martin 156
 Martin 162
 Martin 162-A
 Martin 166
 Martin 167
 Martin 179
 Martin 187
 Martin 193
 Martin 316
 Martin 2-0-2
 Martin 3-0-3
 Martin 4-0-4
 Martin Aerial Freighter
 Martin Baltimore
 Martin GMB
 Martin GMC
 Martin GMP
 Martin GMT
 Martin Great lakes Tourer
 Martin K-3 Scout
 Martin Maryland
 Martin MB-1
 Martin MB-2
 Martin MBT
 Martin MT
 Martin R
 Martin R-Land
 Martin S Hydro
 Martin T
 Martin TT
 Glenn Martin Twin Tractor

Martin 
(Martin Aircraft Company, Christchurch, New Zealand)
 Martin Jetpack

Martin 
(James Vernon, Martin Aeroplane Co, Elyra, OH)
 Martin Bomber
 Martin Harvard I
 Martin K-III Kitten aka Blue Bird
 Martin K-IV
 Martin KF-1

Martin 
(Arthur Martin, Santa Ana, CA)
 Martin Dart

Martin 
()
 Martin Paraplane
 Martin Roadstar

Martin 
(Ray Martin, Smithville, OH)
 Martin 1957 Monoplane

Martin-Boyd 
(Edward Martin & Millard Boyd, Santa Ana, CA)
 Martin-Boyd 1927 Monoplane

Martin-Baker 
 Martin-Baker MB 1
 Martin-Baker MB 2
 Martin-Baker MB 3
 Martin-Baker MB 4
 Martin-Baker MB 5

Martin-Marietta 
 Martin-Marietta X-23 PRIME
 Martin-Marietta X-24
 Martin-Marietta X-24A PILOT
 Martin-Marietta X-24B
 Martin-Marietta X-24C
 Martin-Marietta SV-5J
 Martin-Marietta SV-5P

Martinsyde 
 Martin-Handasyde No. 3
 Martin-Handasyde No.4B Dragonfly
 Martinsyde A1
 Martinsyde F1
 Martinsyde F2
 Martinsyde F3
 Martinsyde F.4 Buzzard
 Martinsyde F6
 Martinsyde Elephant
 Martinsyde G102
 Martinsyde G100
 Martinsyde S1
 Martinsyde Semiquaver
 Martinsyde Raymor

Maruoka 
(Katsura Maruoka)
 Maruoka Man-Powered Screw-Wing Machine (Human powered helicopter)

Maschelin 
 Maschelin M58 Masquito

Maslov 
(E. Maslov)
 Маslov Accord

Mason 
(Joe J Mason, Woodland Hills, CA)
 Mason DH-2 4/5 replica

Mason 
(Monty G Mason, Long Beach, CA)
 Mason Greater Meteor
 Mason Meteor M

Mason 
(Dave Mason, Houston, TX)
 Mason DM-1 Skyblazer

Mason 
(Dave Mason, Houston, TX)
 Mason DM-1 Skyblazer

Masquito 
(Masquito Aircraft)
 Masquito M58
 Masquito M80

Master 
(Master Aircraft, 315 Passaic St, Rochelle Park, NJ)
 Master Greyhound

Mathews 
(Lyle Mathews)
Mathews Mr Easy
Mathews Petit Breezy
Mathews PUP
Mathews Turnerkraft

Mathewson 
(Mathewson Automobile Co, Denver, CO)
 Mathewson#1
 Mathewson#2
 Mathewson#3
 Mathewson#4
 Mathewson#5
 Mathewson#6

MATRA 
(Mécanique Aviation TRAction)
 MATRA-Cantinieau Bamby
 MATRA-Cantinieau MC-101
 MATRA-Cantinieau Faon
 MATRA R.75
 MATRA R.100
 MATRA R.110
 MATRA 360.4 Jupiter
 MATRA 360.6 Jupiter

Matthews 
(Clark B Matthews, 317 Second St Marietta, OH)
 Matthews 2-B a.k.a. CBM Special

Matthieu-Russel 
((---) Mathieu-Charles Russel, Chicago, IL)
 Matthieu-Russel 1929 Monoplane

Mattioni
 Mattioni Botte Volante (Flying barrel) second version

Mattley 
((Henry) Mattley Airplane & Motor Co, San Bruno, CA)
 Mattley FP-1 a.k.a. Fliver #1

Mauboussin 
(Pierre Mauboussin / Avions Mauboussin)
 Mauboussin H.10
 Mauboussin M.10
 Mauboussin M.10bis floatplane
 Mauboussin M.40 Hémiptère
 Mauboussin M.110 'Peyret-Mauboussin PM 110'
 Mauboussin M.111 Peyret-Mauboussin PM XI/M.11 design
 Mauboussin M.112
 Mauboussin M.120 Corsaire
 Mauboussin M.120/32
 Mauboussin M.120/34
 Mauboussin M.120/37 (Project)
 Mauboussin M.121 Corsaire Major
 Mauboussin M.122 Corsaire Major
 Mauboussin M.123 Corsaire
 Mauboussin M.123C
 Mauboussin M.123M (Project)
 Mauboussin M.123R (Project)
 Mauboussin M.123T (Project)
 Mauboussin M.124
 Mauboussin M.125
 Mauboussin M.126
 Mauboussin M.127
 Mauboussin M.128
 Mauboussin M.129
 Mauboussin M.129/48
 Mauboussin M.130 (Project)
 Mauboussin M.160 (Project)
 Mauboussin M.190 (Project)
 Mauboussin MH.190 (Project)
 Mauboussin M.200
 Mauboussin M.201
 Mauboussin M.202
 Mauboussin M.260 (Project)
 Mauboussin FM.260
 Mauboussin M.300
 Mauboussin M.400
 Mauboussin-Zodiac 17

Maule 
(Maule Aircraft Corp.)
 Maule 1931 aeroplane
 Maule M-1 Mid-wing
 Maule M-2 Ornithopter
 Maule M-3 Ornithopter
 Maule M-4
 Maule M-5 Lunar Rocket
 Maule M-6 Super Rocket
 Maule M-7 Super Rocket / Orion / Comet / Star rocket
 Maule M-8
 Maule M-9
 Maule MT-7
 Maule MX-7
 Maule MXT-7
 Maule Bee Dee M-4

Maurice Farman 
See : Farman Aviation Works

Mauro
(Larry Mauro)
 Mauro Solar Riser

MÁVAG 
(Magyar Királyi Állami Vas-, Acél- és Gépgyárak – Royal Hungarian State Iron, Steel and Machine Works)
 MÁVAG Héja

Maverick 
(Maverick Air Inc, Penrose, CO)
 Maverick 1200 TwinJet
 Maverick 1500 TwinJet
 Maverick CruiserJet
 Maverick SmartJet

Max Holste 
(Avions Max Holste)
 Max Holste MH.20
 Max Holste MH.52
 Max Holste MH.53 Cadet
 Max Holste M.H.152
 Max Holste MH.1521 Broussard
 Max Holste MH.1522 Broussard
 Max Holste M.H.153
 Max Holste MH.250 Super Broussard
 Max Holste MH.260 Super Broussard

Max Plan 
 Max Plan PF.204 Busard
 Max Plan PF.205 Busard
 Max Plan PF.207
 Max Plan PF.214
 Max Plan PF.215

Maximum Safety 
(Maximum Safety Airplane Co (Fdr: Fred L Bronson), 5111 Santa Fe Ave, Los Angeles, CA)
 Maximum Safety M-1
 Maximum Safety M-2
 Maximum Safety M-3
 Maximum Safety M-4L

Maxson 
(W L Maxson Corp. / Maxson-Brewster.)
 Maxson NR

Mayberry 
(Oakland CA.)
 Mayberry T-1

Mayer 
(Robert Mayer)
 Mayer 1951 Monoplane

Mayo 
((William Benson) Mayo Radiator Co, New Haven, CT)
 Mayo 1914 Biplane
 Mayo 1916 Biplane
 Mayo Type A

Mayo-Vought-Simplex 
(Simplex Automobile Co, New Brunswick, NJ)
 Simplex 1914 Biplane

Mazel 
 Mazel Acrolaram

References

Further reading

External links 

 List of Aircraft (M)

fr:Liste des aéronefs (I-M)